Sai Yai is one of the seven subdistricts (tambon) of Sai Noi District, in Nonthaburi Province, Thailand. Neighbouring subdistricts are (from north clockwise) Sam Mueang, Rat Niyom, Khun Si, Bang Phasi, Sai Ngam and Ninlaphet. In 2020 it had a total population of 6,400 people.

Administration

Central administration
The subdistrict is subdivided into 11 administrative villages (muban).

Local administration
The whole area of the subdistrict is covered by Sai Yai Subdistrict Administrative Organization.

References

External links
Website of Sai Yai Subdistrict Administrative Organization

Tambon of Nonthaburi province
Populated places in Nonthaburi province